60S ribosomal protein L29 is a protein that in humans is encoded by the RPL29 gene.

Function 

Ribosomes, the organelles that catalyze protein synthesis, consist of a small 40S subunit and a large 60S subunit. Together these subunits are composed of 4 RNA species and approximately 80 structurally distinct proteins. This gene encodes a cytoplasmic ribosomal protein that is a component of the 60S subunit. The protein belongs to the L29E family of ribosomal proteins. The protein is also a peripheral membrane protein expressed on the cell surface that directly binds heparin. Although this gene was previously reported to map to 3q29-qter, it is believed that it is located at 3p21.3-p21.2. As is typical for genes encoding ribosomal proteins, there are multiple processed pseudogenes of this gene dispersed through the genome.

Interactions 

RPL29 has been shown to interact with BLMH.

References

Further reading

External links 
 

Ribosomal proteins